Giovanni De Benedictis (born 8 January 1968, in Pescara) is a retired Italian race walker, that won 9 medals at individual level, 7 of these at senior level, at the International athletics competitions. He participated at five editions of the Summer Olympics (from 1988 to 2004), this like only two others Italian athletes in track and field: the other racewalker champion Abdon Pamich and the sprinter Pietro Mennea. He also won four medals at the IAAF World Race Walking Cup team events (Lugano Trophy).

Biography
Giovanni De Benedictis has won 28 times the individual national championship, third of all-time after Abdon Pamich (40) and Antonio Ambu (34). He has 42 caps in seventeen years in national team from 1987 to 2004.

In addition to the five Olympic Games, he participated in six World Outdoor Championships and two of the World Indoor, four editions of the European Outdoor Championships and five European Indoor, six editions of the World Race Walking Cup and four of the European Race Walking Cup.

World best performances
 3000 metres race walk: 10:47.11,  San Giovanni Valdarno, 19 May 1990. world record held until 4 February 2001, and was beaten by the German Andreas Erm.

Achievements

National titles
He won 28 times the national championships at senior level.

See also
 Italian Athletics Championships - Multi winners
 Italy at the IAAF World Race Walking Cup
 Italian all-time lists - 20 km walk
 Italian all-time lists - 50 km walk
 3000 metres race walk  All-time top 25 fastest

References

External links

 
 Official website

1968 births
Living people
Sportspeople from Pescara
Italian male racewalkers
Olympic athletes of Italy
Olympic bronze medalists for Italy
Athletes (track and field) at the 1988 Summer Olympics
Athletes (track and field) at the 1992 Summer Olympics
Athletes (track and field) at the 1996 Summer Olympics
Athletes (track and field) at the 2000 Summer Olympics
Athletes (track and field) at the 2004 Summer Olympics
World Athletics Championships athletes for Italy
World Athletics Championships medalists
Athletics competitors of Centro Sportivo Carabinieri
Olympic bronze medalists in athletics (track and field)
Mediterranean Games gold medalists for Italy
Mediterranean Games medalists in athletics
Athletes (track and field) at the 1997 Mediterranean Games
Medalists at the 1992 Summer Olympics
Italian Athletics Championships winners